The National Gridiron League (NGL) was a proposed professional American football league in Australia. The inaugural season was scheduled to begin in October 2018. It was originally to begin in 2016, however it was postponed for two years. The League and its teams went silent in 2017 and was presumed defunct from that date. No game was ever played.

The league was to feature a 14-week regular season, which is scheduled to run from October to late January; each team to play seven games with at least two bye weeks. Following the regular season, four teams would compete in the league's playoffs, culminating in a Grand Final championship game in late January.

Teams
Eight teams were planned to compete in the inaugural NGL season in 2017/18:

Regular season

The regular season is 14 weeks long, with games scheduled on October and finishing by February following year. The NGL's eight teams are divided into two states, four in New South Wales and four in Queensland. Each team plays two games against each other. The four best teams from the regular season will pass to the playoffs to play the semi-finals. The winners from the semi-finals will be classified to the Grand Final.

References

External links 
 

American football in Australia
2014 establishments in Australia
Sports leagues established in 2014
American football leagues
Sports leagues in Australia